The Mouca is a left tributary of the river Salcia in Romania. It flows into the Salcia near Șilindru.

References

Rivers of Romania
Rivers of Bihor County